Kalinin is a rural locality (a khutor) in Krasnoulskoye Rural Settlement of Maykopsky District, Russia. The population was 275 as of 2018. There are 6 streets.

Geography 
Kalinin is located 25 km north of Tulsky (the district's administrative centre) by road. Grazhdansky is the nearest rural locality.

References 

Rural localities in Maykopsky District